Cefaparole  (cephaparole) is a cephem antibiotic of the cephalosporin subclass that was never marketed.

References

Cephalosporin antibiotics
Thiadiazoles